Sight was a DVD released in 2005.  The film is a recording of a two-day concert run by Keller Williams in November 2004 at Mr. Small's theater facility in Pittsburgh, Pennsylvania. The video includes 100 minutes of concert footage, including covers of songs by The Grateful Dead (Ship of Fools), Ani DiFranco (Swing) and Harold Arlen/Ted Koehler (Stormy Weather).

Video Track Listings 
 Roshambo
 People Watching
 Juggler
 Fuel for the Road
 Freeker by the Speaker
 Mental Brunette Instra
 Ninja
 Dear Emily
 Above the Thunder
 You Are What You Eat
 Ship of Fools 
 Stormy Weather    
 Dogs   
 Not Tomorrow  
 Swing
 Garage Night
 Best Feeling  
 Smurd

Credits
Megan Agosto - Editing  
Mark Berger - Package Design  
Jeff Covert - Mixing  
Randy Grosclaude - Lighting Designer
Larry Luther - Engineer  
Sara Maher - Producer  
Kevin Morris - Executive Producer  
Joe Rice Technical - Director, Authoring  
Keller Williams - Mixing

References

Keller Williams video albums
2005 video albums
2005 live albums
Live video albums